Adampur Airport , is a domestic airport and an Indian Air Force base serving the cities of Jalandhar and Hoshiarpur in Punjab, India. It just beside NH-3. As it lies just between the cities of Jalandhar and Hoshiarpur, it serves both the cities. The airport was required by the Doaba region of Punjab for facilitating commercial operations, as the other two main airports of the state at Amritsar and Chandigarh are 100 and 145 km distant, respectively.

History
The airport was built around 1950s. It was made as a base for the Indian Air Force (IAF). The base played a crucial role in the Indo-Pakistani War of 1965. On 6 September 1965, the Pakistan Air Force (PAF) attacked Indian bases at Pathankot, Halwara and Adampur. The attacks on Halwara and Adampur were failures. The strike group turned back before even reaching Adampur.

On the next day (7 September 1965), the PAF parachuted 135 Special Services Group (SSG) para-commandos at the same three Indian airfields (Halwara, Pathankot and Adampur). The daring attempt proved to be an unavoidable impact. Only ten commandos were able to return to Pakistan, while the rest were taken as prisoners of war (including one of the commanders of the operations, Major Khalid Butt). At Adampur, these troops landed in residential areas where the villagers caught, and handed them over to the police.

The Indo-Pakistani War of 1971 on western front started with Operation Chengiz Khan on 3 December 1971. The Pathankot base was hit and the runway was heavily damaged. Pathankot was covered by interceptors from Adampur. Following this first strikez during the time, it took the ground crew to repair its runway.

During the Kargil War, flying from Adampur, the mirages of No. 7 Squadron IAF struck at Tigerhill, Muntho Dhalo and Tololing.

In 2010s, the airport was considered by the Government of Punjab and the Ministry of Civil Aviation to develop the Adampur base into a commercial airport to boost connectivity and socio-economic development of Jalandhar and adjoining regions. In 2017, the Airports Authority of India (AAI) completed the construction of a new passenger terminal and began commercial operations, with daily and weekly flight services to Delhi, Mumbai and Jaipur operated by SpiceJet. However, until the end of 2019, the airline stopped all operations from the airport indefinitely, due to the wake of COVID-19, and as of 2023, there has been no further updates on the resumption of flights services from the airport.

Infrastructure
The Airports Authority of India (AAI) built a passenger terminal at a cost of ₹ 18 crore  at Kandola village of Jalandhar district, adjoining to the air force base to facilitate commercial civil aviation and connectivity, as well as development, in 2017. The Government of India cleared the techno-feasibility report for setting up the passenger terminal in July 2015, after AAI had inspected the proposed site of 50 acres of land, after receiving No Objection Certificate (NOC) from the Indian Air Force.
Commercial flights started on 1 May 2018, when SpiceJet began operations under the government's UDAN Scheme. The new terminal covers an area of 75,000 sq.ft. (42 acres). The contract of the new terminal were given to edifice consultants.

Adampur Air Force Station 
Adampur Air Force Station, Jalandhar is the air force base of the Indian Air Force, in which the passenger terminal for commercial operations is situated. It is the second largest military airbase of India. It lies within  from the India-Pakistan Border, and is home to squadrons No. 47 Squadron IAF and No. 223 Squadron IAF.

The air force station operates the MiG-29UPG variant, after recently completed overhauls to the older B/UB fleet.

Airlines and destinations
As of March 2023, there are no flights operated to and from the airport. SpiceJet used to operate daily and weekly flights to Delhi, Mumbai and Jaipur, until the end 2019. There is no update on resumption of flights to the airport yet.

Statistics

Connectivity 
The airport is located close to Adampur town of Jalandhar district, and could be accessed via NH-3 and also from the nearest railway station of Adampur.

See also

List of Indian Air Force stations
Western Air Command (India)
Indian Air Force
8-Pass Charlie

References

External Links 
 https://www.jagran.com/punjab/jalandhar-city-100-kld-capacity-sewerage-treatment-plant-to-be-set-up-at-adampur-airport-22643130.html

Indian Air Force bases
Airports in Punjab, India
Jalandhar district
Airports with year of establishment missing